The Polish Basketball League Top Scorer contains a list of the Polish Basketball League (PLK)'s full season scoring leaders. Both regular season and playoff games are counted in the stats leaders. Edward Jurkiewicz led the league in points per game a record 8 times, in the years 1970, 1971, 1972, 1974, 1975, 1976, 1977, and 1978.

Polish League full season top scorers by total points scored 

Counting both regular season and playoff games.
Nationality by national team.

Polish League full season top scorers by points per game 

Counting both regular season and playoff games.
Nationality by national team.

References

External links
PLK History Statistics 
Polska Liga Koszykówki - Official Site 
Polish League at Eurobasket.com

Basketball in Poland
Polish Basketball League